Verbosity, or verboseness, is speech or writing that uses more words than necessary. The opposite of verbosity is plain language. 

Some teachers, including the author of The Elements of Style, warn against verbosity. Similarly Mark Twain and Ernest Hemingway, among others, famously avoid it. 

Synonyms of "verbosity" include wordiness, verbiage, prolixity, grandiloquence, garrulousness, expatiation, logorrhea, sesquipedalianism, and overwriting.

Etymology and synonyms
The word verbosity comes from Latin verbosus, "wordy". There are many other English words that also refer to the use of excessive words.

Prolixity comes from Latin prolixus, "extended". Prolixity can also be used to refer to the length of a monologue or speech, especially a formal address such as a lawyer's oral argument.

Grandiloquence is complex speech or writing judged to be pompous or bombastic diction. It is a combination of the Latin words grandis ("great") and loqui ("to speak").

Logorrhea or logorrhoea (from Greek λογόρροια, logorrhoia, "word-flux") is an excessive flow of words. It is often used pejoratively to describe prose that is hard to understand because it is needlessly complicated or uses excessive jargon.

Sesquipedalianism is a linguistic style that involves the use of long words. Roman poet Horace coined the phrase sesquipedalia verba in his Ars Poetica. It is a compound of sesqui, "one and a half", and pes, "foot", a reference to meter (not words a foot long). The earliest recorded usage in English of sesquipedalian is in 1656, and of sesquipedalianism, 1863.

Garrulous comes from Latin garrulus, "talkative", a form of the verb garrīre, "to chatter". The adjective may describe a person who is excessively talkative, especially about trivial matters, or a speech that is excessively wordy or diffuse

The noun expatiation and the verb expatiate come from Latin expatiātus, past participle from spatiārī, "to wander". They refer to enlarging a discourse, text, or description.

Overwriting is a simple compound of the English prefix "over-" ("excessive") and "writing", and as the name suggests, means using extra words that add little value.  One rhetoric professor described it as "a wordy writing style characterized by excessive detail, needless repetition, overwrought figures of speech, and/or convoluted sentence structures."  Another writer cited "meaningless intensifiers", "adjectival & adverbial verbosity", "long conjunctions and subordinators", and "repetition and needless information" as common traps that the non-native writers of English the author studied fell into.

Scientific jargon
An essay intentionally filled with "logorrhea" that mixed  physics concepts with sociological concepts in a nonsensical way was published by physics professor Alan Sokal in a journal (Social Text) as a scholarly publishing sting. The episode became known as the Sokal Affair.

The term is sometimes also applied to unnecessarily wordy speech in general; this is more usually referred to as prolixity. Some people defend the use of additional words as idiomatic, a matter of artistic preference, or helpful in explaining complex ideas or messages.

Examples
Warren G. Harding, the 29th President of the United States, was notably verbose even in his era.  A Democratic leader, William Gibbs McAdoo, described Harding's speeches as "an army of pompous phrases moving across the landscape in search of an idea."

The Michigan Law Review published a 229-page parody of postmodern writing titled "Pomobabble: Postmodern Newspeak and Constitutional 'Meaning' for the Uninitiated". The article consists of complicated and context-sensitive self-referencing narratives. The text is peppered with a number of parenthetical citations and asides, which is supposed to mock the cluttered style of postmodern writing.

In The King's English, Fowler gives a passage from The Times as an example of verbosity: "The Emperor received yesterday and to-day General Baron von Beck.... It may therefore be assumed with some confidence that the terms of a feasible solution are maturing themselves in His Majesty's mind and may form the basis of further negotiations with Hungarian party leaders when the Monarch goes again to Budapest." Fowler objected to this passage because The Emperor, His Majesty, and the Monarch all refer to the same person: "the effect", he pointed out in Modern English Usage, " is to set readers wondering what the significance of the change is, only to conclude that there is none." Fowler would go on to call this phenomenon "Elegant variation" in his later style guides (see below).

Style advice
The ancient Greek philosopher Callimachus is quoted as saying "Big book, big evil" (μέγα βιβλίον μέγα κακόν, mega biblion, mega kakon), rejecting the epic style of poetry in favor of his own.

Many style guides advise against excessive verbosity. While it may be rhetorically useful verbose parts in communications are sometimes referred to as "fluff" or "fuzz". For instance, William Strunk, an American professor of English advised in 1918 to "Use the active voice: Put statements in positive form; Omit needless words."

In A Dictionary of Modern English Usage (1926) Henry Watson Fowler says, "It is the second-rate writers, those intent rather on expressing themselves prettily than on conveying their meaning clearly, & still more those whose notions of style are based on a few misleading rules of thumb, that are chiefly open to the allurements of elegant variation," Fowler's term for the over-use of synonyms. Contrary to Fowler's criticism of several words being used to name the same thing in English prose, in many other languages, including French, it might be thought to be a good writing style.

An inquiry into the 2005 London bombings found that verbosity can be dangerous if used by emergency services. It can lead to delay that could cost lives.

A 2005 study from the psychology department of Princeton University found that using long and obscure words does not make people seem more intelligent. Dr. Daniel M. Oppenheimer did research which showed that students rated short, concise texts as being written by the most intelligent authors. But those who used long words or complex font types were seen as less intelligent.

In contrast to advice against verbosity, some editors and style experts suggest that maxims such as "omit needless words" are unhelpful. It may be unclear which words are unnecessary, or where advice against prolixity may harm writing. In some cases a degree of repetition and redundancy, or use of figurative language and long or complex sentences can have positive effects on style or communicative effect.

In nonfiction writing, experts suggest that a balance must be struck between, on one hand removing excessive elements that do not aid communication, versus unduly terse style on the other hand, which fails to make its meaning clear. Law professor Neil Andrews suggests that in the writing of legal decisions, for example, "A balance must be struck between judgments which are inadequately reasoned and too terse, cryptic and formulaic, and decisions (especially when multiple judgments are given by an appellate court) which are too long and difficult to unravel." In such cases attention should be paid to the argument underlying a conclusion, so that the language used strikes a balance between simplicity and precision.

A number of writers advise against excessive verbosity in fiction. For example, Mark Twain (1835–1910) wrote "generally, the fewer the words that fully communicate or evoke the intended ideas and feelings, the more effective the communication." Similarly Ernest Hemingway (1899–1961), the 1954 Nobel laureate for literature, defended his concise style against a charge by William Faulkner that he "had never been known to use a word that might send the reader to the dictionary." Hemingway responded by saying, "Poor Faulkner. Does he really think big emotions come from big words? He thinks I don't know the ten-dollar words. I know them all right. But there are older and simpler and better words, and those are the ones I use."

George Orwell mocked logorrhea in "Politics and the English Language" (1946) by taking verse (9:11) from the book of Ecclesiastes in the King James Version of the Bible:

and rewriting it as

In contrast, though, some authors warn against pursuing concise writing for its own sake. Literary critic Sven Birkerts, for instance, notes that authors striving to reduce verbosity might produce prose that is unclear in its message or dry in style. "There's no vivid world where every character speaks in one-line, three-word sentences," he notes. There is a danger that the avoidance of prolixity can produce writing that feels unnatural or sterile.

Physicist Richard Feynman has spoken out against verbosity in scientific writing. 

Wordiness is common in informal or playful conversation, lyrics, and comedy.

See also

 Bloviation,  a style of empty, pompous political speech
 Bullshit bingo
 Cantinflear
 
 Elaboration
 Gift of the gab
 Glittering generality
 Gobbledygook, nonsensical speech
 List of Germanic and Latinate equivalents in English
 Logorrhea (psychology)
 Obfuscation, intentionally confusing wording to confuse people
 Pleonasm, use of more words than is necessary for expression
 Readability
 Redundancy (linguistics)
 Tachylalia, extremely rapid speech

References

Further reading
 Dan Lyons, "On Mute: Overtalkers are everywhere – but saying less will get you more", Time, vol. 201, nos. 3–4 (30 Jan., 6 Feb. 2023), pp. 62–66.

Grammar
Phraseology
Rhetoric
Semantics
Language varieties and styles
Literary terminology
Style (fiction)
Writing